Boys Over Flowers Season 2, known in Japan as , is a Japanese manga series written and illustrated by Yoko Kamio. It is a sequel to Kamio's Boys Over Flowers, The story takes place at Eitoku Academy, two years after the members of the F4 have graduated, with all new characters.

The manga began serialization with its first three chapters in Shueisha's digital online magazine Shōnen Jump+ from February 2015 to December 2019 with its chapters collected into fefteen tankōbon. In North America the manga is licensed by Viz Media.

Plot
Years after the F4 have graduated, Eitoku Academy has not been the same. Due to the recession, there has been a decline in enrollment. Contributing to this is the rise of rival school, Momonozono Academy, that has been taking in more students. A new clique called the Correct 5 now rules the school and has been targeting students whose families have not donated by making them leave school. The leader of the Correct 5, Haruto Kakuragi, is the most popular boy at Eitoku Academy. However, he secretly buys gimmicky self-help items to become strong. Oto Edogawa is a female student at Eitoku who pretends to be rich in order to fit in when in reality, she is impoverished. She works part-time at a convenience store, when one night she sees Haruto Kakuragi coming into the store picking up the items he had purchased. Both are shocked to see each other. The next day, they confront each other and agree to keep each other's secrets.

Characters

Portrayed by: Hana Sugisaki
Oto is a girl who transferred into Eitoku Academy during the second semester of middle school 2nd year, now in her second semester of 3rd-year high school. Her family used to be rich, but after her father's company went bankrupt, she pretends to be rich ever since in order to fit in. She doesn't like the Correct 5 and their ways. While she doesn't like Haruto at first, she slowly warms up to him when he saved her from an attempted kidnapping by one of her co-workers. It is revealed the reason she is at Eitoku is that she is engaged to someone and will be married when she turns 18. Her fiance is revealed to be Tenma Hase.

Portrayed by: Sho Hirano
The leader of the Correct 5, Haruto is the most handsome and popular boy at Eitoku Academy. Secretly, he worries about being scrawny and usually orders items from magazines and home shopping that don't actually work. When he was younger, he was saved from bullies by Tsukasa Domyouji and has since aimed to be just like him. This also motivates him to rebuild the reputation of Eitoku Academy. He realizes he is in love with Oto after going on a date with her and finding out about her engagement.

Portrayed by: Taishi Nakagawa
The student council president of Momonozono Academy. He is considered a star pupil at Momonozono and the reason why many students are applying there instead of Eitoku. It is revealed that Tenma is Oto's fiancee.

Portrayed by: Tatsuomi Hamada
The right-hand man and best friend of Haruto, Kaito is the only one who knows about his secret. He is the intelligent member of Correct 5.

Portrayed by: Mio Imada
Airi is the sole female member of the Correct 5. She is easily distinguishable by her twin-tailed hair. Her father owns a shopping mall. A spoiled girl who acts like a queen. She is jealous of Oto hanging around Haruto.

The athletic member of the Correct 5.

Media

Manga
Boys Over Flowers Season 2 is written and illustrated by Yoko Kamio. The manga began serialization with its first three chapters in Shueisha's digital online magazine Shōnen Jump+ from February 15, 2015 to December 22, 2019 with its chapters collected into fefteen tankōbon volumes. Viz Media began publishing an English version the same day it began in Japan as part of their Jump Start initiative. They published the first four chapters in their digital magazine Weekly Shonen Jump before shifting to posting the chapters for free on their website. The manga ended on December 22, 2019, and the fifteenth volume was published on March 15, 2020.

Live-action series

A Japanese live-action drama series aired on TBS from April to June of 2018. It stars Hana Sugisaki as Oto Edogawa, Sho Hirano as Haruto Kaguragi, and Taishi Nakagawa as Tenma Hase. Idol group King & Prince performed the theme song titled .

Reception
The first tankōbon volume of Boys Over Flowers Season 2 sold 28,606 copies in its first week.

References

External links
 Boys Over Flowers Season 2 at Shōnen Jump +
 Boys Over Flowers Season 2 at Viz Media
 

Boys Over Flowers
Romantic comedy anime and manga
School life in anime and manga
Shōnen manga
Shueisha manga
Viz Media manga
2015 webcomic debuts
Japanese webcomics
Webcomics in print
2019 webcomic endings